Klette is a surname of German origin. Notable people with the surname include:

Immanuel J. Klette (1918-1988), American bomber pilot and squadron commander
Jon Klette (1962–2016), Norwegian jazz musician, alto saxophone player, composer and record producer
Károly Klette (1793–1874), Hungarian court painter and graphic artist
Leif Klette (1927–2017), Norwegian fencer

References

Surnames of German origin